Eddie and the Cruisers II: Eddie Lives! is the 1989 sequel to the 1983 film Eddie and the Cruisers. It is directed by Jean-Claude Lord, and based on literary characters created by author P. F. Kluge. Michael Paré and Matthew Laurance reprise their roles as Eddie Wilson and Sal Amato, respectively. The film was marketed with the tagline "The legend. The music. The man."

Director Lord and several members of the film's supporting cast (Marina Orsini, Vlasta Vrána, and Mark Brennan) had previously worked together on the French-Canadian television series Lance et Compte. Additionally, cast members Harvey Atkin and Kate Lynch had earlier co-starred in the comedy film Meatballs (1979).

Plot

Satin Records rejected rock and roll band Eddie and the Cruisers' last album A Season in Hell twenty years earlier. Now Satin launches an "Eddie Lives!" campaign to make more money off Eddie's image as a publicity stunt, despite their belief that Eddie is dead. The record label re-releases the band's first album, which becomes an even bigger hit than its first release. The "lost recordings" from Season in Hell that were discovered in the previous film are released and become a major hit album.

A mystery demo tape—proved by a voice expert to feature Eddie Wilson playing on it and that may or may not have been recorded after Eddie “died”—is discovered by the record company—which then adds this discovery to the “Eddie Lives!” campaign in order to find anyone to resolve the matter.

Meanwhile, Eddie Wilson is actually alive. He slipped away from the car crash which supposedly caused his death and began a new life under an assumed name. He was disgusted by the music industry and decided to leave it behind. The newly generated spotlight on his supposed death angers the reclusive rocker, who now resides in Canada as construction worker Joe West.

Eddie gets involved with a struggling bar band, and his passion for music—along with his desperate anger—resurface. He decides to confront Eddie's talents once and for all. Eddie ("Joe West") challenges the bar band's talent, accepts an invitation to play and quickly dazzles the audience and the band's members. One of the band, saxophone player Hilton Overstreet's eyes widen when he first hears Eddie on guitar, but he says nothing. Eddie abruptly leaves the stage, disturbed by memories of Wendall Newton while Hilton plays a brief sax solo. Guitarist Rick Diesel pursues Eddie and badgers him about joining the band. Eddie finally begins to play again and the two circulate through Montreal's music scene, hand-picking musicians for a new band, Rock Solid.

Eddie fights against his personal demons amidst the band's rising success as Rock Solid begins to tour and win fans. Their popularity closely mirrors Eddie's former success with Eddie and the Cruisers, and he is disturbed by the similarities.

During the tour Eddie, still known to his band as Joe, begins to have more frequent flashbacks to his former life. His anger and pride peak when lead guitarist Rick Diesel calls a woman they met at gig who wants the band to audition for an upcoming music festival. Eddie's angry tirade is soothed by sax player Hilton Overstreet's cool demeanor and Rick's fast talking. Eddie caves into the band's desire to do the large public performance he so fears. He agrees under the condition that they lock themselves away in a cabin, where there are "no distractions" so they can get back to the music. The band begins to lose its momentum and Eddie's wrath finally explodes. He smashes his guitar into pieces and storms off. Hilton confronts him and says, "First you destroy your guitar, now your songs. You gonna be next"? To which Eddie replies, "They're lousy songs. They don't even burn good". Hilton then says, "It's a good thing you know 'em by heart. Be a shame to lose that many songs by Eddie Wilson." In one of the movie's defining moments, Hilton says, "I knew who you were from the moment I heard you play. The way a man plays—he's born with it; like fingerprints." He suggests that Eddie has no destiny but musician Eddie Wilson, and not Joe West, construction worker.

Satin Records has been upping the ante for anyone who can provide proof that Eddie lives. A few scenes before, an expert proved that legendary Bo Diddley had played on the mystery tapes before the death of Cruisers sax player Wendell Newton and Eddie's presumed demise in the river. In seclusion for over a month, Rick is unaware of the mounting tension around the mystery of Eddie's whereabouts. He decides to send a tape to Satin Records with a note that contains the line, "I have a band and my lead singer sure sounds a lot like Eddie Wilson."

The band auditions for the Music Festival and wins a spot in it. Eddie's doubts return. His life and true identity are about to go public. In desperation, he turns to his longtime friend and confidant Sal Amato. Sal and Eddie meet on a New Jersey beach and hash out twenty years of anger and grief. Sal demands to know where these "so-called-mystery tapes were recorded". Eddie takes Sal back to the old abandoned church where in 1963, he and former sax player Wendell Newton had a jam session with a large group of black musicians, including Bo Diddley. Eddie confesses that the whole affair, combined with what seemed to be a lukewarm reaction from the industry he had admired and aspired to join, made him feel inadequate. In one of his deeper moments, Sal tells Eddie a simple truth: it's not about setting the world on fire, it's about playing the music. Armed and primed with that sentiment in mind, Eddie returns to Montreal, ready to play the festival.

Meanwhile, someone tells the “Eddie Lives!” campaign of Wendell’s presence on the mystery tape—publicly establishing that it was record prior to Eddie’s apparent death and that the idea that Eddie Wilson is alive is still unproven. However, in Canada Eddie’s new band is about to take the stage when Rick's earlier ploy pays off. Satin Records' two executives appear and recognize Eddie. Confronted by one of the two men who once told him his music was unsuitable for release, Eddie flies into a frenzy and runs out to his car. His girlfriend, Diane Armani, runs after him and shouts that maybe they can find a bridge and do it right this time. She convinces him that although the world will discover who Joe West really is tomorrow, Eddie can still claim today for himself. Eddie takes the stage and is caught up by the thrill of performing live again and the audience's acclaim for their first song, "Running Through the Fire". Eddie introduces his bandmates one by one, then pauses. Diane nods to him and Eddie joyfully proclaims, "and me. I'm Eddie Wilson." A breathless silence greets his announcement, then the audience begins to chant "Eddie! Eddie!" Eddie grins, shouts, "Okay, let's rock 'n' roll!" The band launches into their next song as the ending credits roll.

Cast

Special guest appearances by:
 Larry King
 Martha Quinn
 Bo Diddley

Filming
The film was quickly made in just over 30 days from March to mid-April 1989. The concert scenes for the finale and Eddie's big return onstage were filmed on April 24, 1989 in Las Vegas Paradise, Nevada at the Thomas & Mack Center in between sets of Bon Jovi's headlining "New Jersey" tour (after Skid Row's opening set) concert.

Reception
The film was released on only 402 screens nationwide on the weekend of August 18, 1989, just grossing $536,508. It was then quickly pulled from theaters by Aurora Productions.

Soundtrack release
The soundtrack was released on August 18, 1989 by Scotti Brothers Records, which reached #121 on the U.S. Billboard charts.

Video releases
The film was released on VHS and videodisc in the United States on January 18, 1990. The DVD was released in 1998, then in 2008 as a combo pack with the first film. Shout! Factory released both films as a Blu-ray exclusive on April 14, 2015.

References

External links
 
 
 

1989 films
1989 independent films
1989 romantic drama films
1980s musical drama films
American independent films
American musical drama films
American rock music films
American romantic drama films
American sequel films
Canadian independent films
Canadian musical drama films
Canadian rock music films
Canadian romantic drama films
Canadian sequel films
English-language Canadian films
1980s English-language films
Fictional musical groups
Films directed by Jean-Claude Lord
Aurora Productions films
1980s American films
1980s Canadian films